Andrew Bruck (1982/1983) was the Acting Attorney General of New Jersey.  He took office on July 17, 2021, after being appointed by Governor Phil Murphy.   Effective February 14, 2022 Bruck was replaced as Acting Attorney General by Matt Platkin, whose nomination as Attorney General is pending before the New Jersey State Senate following Platkin's appointment by Murphy on February 3, 2022.

Bruck was a federal prosecutor before joining the office of then-newly installed Attorney General Gurbir Grewal in January 2018 as Executive Assistant Attorney General.  Bruck was subsequently promoted to First Assistant Attorney General.  Grewal resigned effective July 16, 2021 to take a position with the U.S. Securities and Exchange Commission.

Bruck is openly gay and resides with his husband and their infant daughter.

References

21st-century LGBT people
Gay politicians
LGBT lawyers
American LGBT politicians
Living people
New Jersey Attorneys General
New Jersey Democrats
Year of birth missing (living people)